Notre Dame of Cotabato, formerly known as Notre Dame of Cotabato Boys' Department, is a private Roman Catholic school run by the Marist Brothers in Cotabato City, Maguindanao, Philippines. It was established in 1948.

History 
On 1941, Emile Boldoc of the Oblate Fathers (OMI) invited the Marist Brothers from the Province of United States to start an educational mission in Mindanao. The school building was already built around 1945 but because of World War II, the planned opening was delayed for a couple of years. After the war, four Marist Brothers namely, Br. Maurus James Doherty, FMS, Br. Herbert Daniel Dumont,  FMS,  Br. Joseph Damian Teston, FMS, and Br. Peter Leonard Thommen, FMS arrived in Cotabato in 1948. On June 21, 1948, the said four Marist Brothers took over the school from the Oblates, thus becoming the first Marist school in the Philippines. The Religious of Virgin Mary (RVM) Sisters, who had been helping the Oblates in running the school, then took care of the girls' department (now Notre Dame – RVM College of Cotabato), while the Brothers has the boys' department, thus giving birth to Notre Dame of Cotabato (Boys' Department). In June 1996, the school opened an afternoon shift program for boys and girls. In June 2000, the school started to admit girls to the regular day shift session. Notre Dame of Cotabato (or N.D.C.) is the only Marist School in Cotabato City.

Basic Education Department

Junior High School 
 Grade 7 to 10

Senior High School

Academic Track 
 Science, Technology, Engineering, and Mathematics
 Accountancy, Business, and Management
 Humanities and Social Sciences

References

External links 
 Wikimapia: Notre Dame of Cotabato (Cotabato City)

Marist Brothers schools
Notre Dame Educational Association
Schools in Cotabato City
Educational institutions established in 1948
1948 establishments in the Philippines
Private schools in the Philippines
Catholic elementary schools in the Philippines
Catholic secondary schools in the Philippines